Eduard Veranyan (born 16 August 1963) is an Armenian former professional footballer.

In 1991, he moved from FC Araks to FC Kotayk.

References

1963 births
Living people
Soviet footballers
Armenian footballers
Armenian expatriate footballers
Expatriate footballers in Russia
Expatriate footballers in Georgia (country)
FC Ararat Yerevan players
Association football forwards
Soviet Armenians
Soviet Top League players